Geoffrey Norris (born 1947) is an English musicologist and music critic. His scholarship focuses on Russian composers; in particularly, Norris is a leading scholar on the life and music of Sergei Rachmaninoff, about whom he has written in numerous articles and a 1976 book-length study. He was chief classical music critic of The Daily Telegraph from 1995 to 2009.

Life and career
Geoffrey Norris was born in London, England in 1947. An enthusiast of Russian culture since his youth, Norris attended the University of Durham and where his undergraduate dissertation concerned The Five, a leading group of 19th-century Russian composers. He continued his studies of Russian music at the Russian State Institute of Performing Arts. From 1995 to 2009, he was chief classical music critic of The Daily Telegraph. Norris has been a lecturer at the Royal Northern College of Music and numerous other universities, as well as a jury member for many piano competitions. Norris currently teaches at the Rachmaninoff Music Academy, London and the Gnesin Music Academy, Moscow.

Norris' scholarship focuses on Russian composers, and in particular, Sergei Rachmaninoff.  He has written numerous articles, and a book length study on Rachmaninoff, whose works he catalogued in a 1982 publication with Robert Threlfall.

Selected publications

Books

Articles

References

External links
 Articles by Geoffrey Norris in The Daily Telegraph

1947 births
Living people
People from London
English musicologists
English music critics
Classical music critics
Alumni of Durham University